Mannomustine (INN), also known as mannitol nitrogen mustard, tradename Degranol is an old alkylating antineoplastic agent from the group of nitrogen mustards. It was first synthesized and characterized in 1957 by Vargha et al.

The mechanism of antineoplastic activity of mannomustine, like for all other alkylating agents, lies in its ability to alkylate DNA guanine nucleobases and, thus, to prevent uncoupling of DNA strands, which is a required step for any cell to divide.

Mannomustine was, at the time of its creation as a drug, claimed to be considerably less toxic than mechlorethamine. For example, the LD50 in rats, for intravenous mannomustine administration route, is claimed to be about 56 mg/kg.

See also 
 Mannitol

References 

Alkylating antineoplastic agents
Nitrogen mustards
Chloroethyl compounds